Stamp Creek is a stream in the U.S. state of Georgia. It empties into Lake Allatoona.

Stamp Creek was named from fact livestock stamped the ground at a nearby mineral lick.

See also
List of rivers of Georgia (U.S. state)

References

Rivers of Bartow County, Georgia
Rivers of Cherokee County, Georgia
Rivers of Georgia (U.S. state)